Luka Lenič (born 13 May 1988) is a Slovenian chess player who holds the FIDE title of Grandmaster. He is the top ranked chess player of his country. Lenič won the under-14 division of the World Youth Chess Championships in Heraklion in 2002. He won the Slovenian Chess Championship in 2008, 2009, 2010 and 2013. Lenič has played for the Slovenian national team in the Chess Olympiad, European Team Chess Championship, Mitropa Cup and European Youth Team Championship. He competed in the FIDE World Cup in 2017.

References

External links
 
 
 
 

1988 births
Living people
Slovenian chess players
Chess grandmasters
Chess Olympiad competitors
World Youth Chess Champions
Sportspeople from Ljubljana